The Hungary women's national beach handball team is the national beach handball team of Hungary. It is governed by the Hungarian Handball Federation and takes part in international beach handball competitions.

Results

World Championships
 2004 – 5th place
 2006 – 7th place
 2010 – 7th place
 2012 – 4th place
 2014 – 2nd place
 2016 – 4th place
 2022 – Qualified

European Championships

 2009 – 6th place
 2011 – 5th place
 2013 – 1st place
 2015 – 1st place
 2017 – 10th place
 2019 – 2nd place

Team

Current squad
The following team represented Hungary on the 2019 European Beach Handball Championships¹ and the World Beach Games 2019²:

 Rebeka Benzsay¹
 Csenge Braun¹
 Renáta Csiki¹²
 Fanni Friebesz¹
 Ágnes Győri¹² (GK)
 Gréta Hadfi¹ (GK)
 Réka Király¹²
 Fruzsina Kretz¹²
 Gabriella Landi¹²
 Evelin Speth¹²
 Sára Sütő²
 Emese Tóth¹²
 Luca Vajda¹²
 Ramóna Vártok² (GK)

Staff members
  Head Coach: Bakó Botond
  Assistant Coach: Andrea Farkas

References

External links
Official website 
IHF profile

Women's national beach handball teams
Women's national sports teams of Hungary